Archibald Alexander McBeth Duncan, FBA, FRHistS, FRSE (17 October 1926 – 20 December 2017) was a Scottish historian.

From 1962 to 1993 he was Professor of Scottish History and Literature at the University of Glasgow. On giving up his professorship, he became Clerk of Senate and Dean of Faculties, retiring from the university in 2000. From 2001 he was Emeritus Professor of Scottish History and Literature, but continued to publish on the history of Scotland in the Middle Ages.

Select bibliography
 Scotland: The Making of the Kingdom. Edinburgh: Edinburgh University Press, 1973.
 The Kingship of the Scots: Succession and Independence 842–1292. Edinburgh: Edinburgh University Press, 2002.

References

External links
 British Academy biographical note

2017 deaths
1926 births
Academics of the University of Glasgow
20th-century Scottish historians
Fellows of the British Academy
Fellows of the Royal Historical Society
Fellows of the Royal Society of Edinburgh